Fátima Miranda is a Spanish singer and researcher born in Salamanca, Province of Salamanca, Spain. She has a  bachelor's degree in history of art, with a specialization in modern art. As a singer, her compositions touch several genres like Mongol Song or  Indian Dhrupad.  She has investigated the human voice and created exclusive voice techniques, classified by tonality and register.  Her interest in the avant-garde also covers video, minimal music, stage arts and artist-public contact.

With Llorenç Barber, she formed the group Taller de Música Mandana in 1979. She was the director of the phonotheque of  Complutense University of Madrid from 1982 to 1989. In 2009, Fátima Miranda was awarded the "Demetrio Stratos" International Prize for experimental music.

Fátima Miranda has published two books about architecture and urbanism. She lives in Madrid.

Discography 
 Las Voces de la Voz 1992
 Concierto en directo 1994
 Cantos Robados 1996
 ArteSonado 2000

References

External links 

Website

Year of birth missing (living people)
Living people
People from Salamanca
Spanish women singers
Phoneticians